In cricket, a five-wicket haul (also known as a "five–for" or "fifer") refers to a bowler taking five or more wickets in a single innings. This is regarded as a notable achievement, and as of December 2015 only 45 bowlers have taken at least 15 five-wicket hauls at international level in their cricketing careers. Richie Benaud, a leg spinner and former captain of the Australia cricket team, played 63 Tests for his country between 1952 and 1964. He took 248 wickets at an average of 27.03, including 16 five-wicket hauls. The cricket almanack Wisden named him one of their Cricketers of the Year in 1962. He was inducted into the Australian Cricket Hall of Fame in 2007, and into the ICC Cricket Hall of Fame as one of the inaugural members in January 2009. Leo McKinstry, a cricket writer, in 1998 described Benaud as "one of cricket's greatest legends" and "one of the great all-rounders", and further noted him being the first to take 200 wickets and make 2,000 runs in Tests.

Benaud made his Test debut in January 1952 against the West Indies at the Sydney Cricket Ground, a match Australia won by 202 runs. His first Test five-wicket haul came in the first match of the 1956–57 series against India at the Corporation Stadium. He took 7 wickets for 72 runs in the first innings of the match, his best bowling figures for an innings. Benaud took his solitary pair of five-wicket hauls in the third Test of the series at the Eden Gardens. He accumulated 11 wickets for 105 runs in the match, his career-best performance in Test cricket. Benaud claimed his 16 five-wicket hauls against five different opponents, and Australia never lost any of the games on such instances. He was most successful against India and South Africa, taking 5 five-wicket hauls against each side. Benaud took his five-wicket hauls at 12 cricket grounds, including 11 at venues outside Australia. As of August 2014, he is thirty-first among all-time combined five-wicket haul takers.

Key

Test five-wicket hauls

Notes

References

External links
 
 

Benaud, Richie
Benaud, Richie